Tsuen Wan Rural  is one of the 18 constituencies in the Tsuen Wan District of Hong Kong which was created in 2015.

The constituency loosely covers the Tsing Lung Tau area with an estimated population of 19,600.

Councillors represented

Election results

2010s

References

Constituencies of Hong Kong
Constituencies of Tsuen Wan District Council
2015 establishments in Hong Kong
Constituencies established in 2015
Tsing Lung Tau